Omiostola detodesma is a species of moth of the family Tortricidae. It is found in Colombia.

The wingspan is about 37 mm. The forewings are brownish, but the costa and dorsum are brown and the posterior area of the wing from the mid-costa to the tornus is brown with a rust admixture and a large area of refractive grey dashes. The hindwings are dark brown.

Etymology
The species name refers to the distinct cingulum and is derived from Greek deta (meaning a strengthening particle) and desma (meaning a fascia).

References

	

Moths described in 2011
Olethreutini
Taxa named by Józef Razowski